Polka Theatre is a children’s theatre in Wimbledon, London Borough of Merton, for children aged 0– 13. The theatre contains two performance spaces - a 300-seat main auditorium and a 70-seat studio dedicated to early years performances. Polka Theatre is a producing theatre which also tours shows nationally and internationally.

The building also features a creative learning studio, a garden, an outdoor playground, indoor play area, exhibition spaces and a cafe.

Polka Theatre is a registered charity number 256979   and an Arts Council England National Portfolio Organisation. It is also funded by the London Borough of Merton and a number of private charitable trusts and foundations, individuals and commercial companies.

History
Polka Theatre started life as a puppet touring company in 1967 under the Artistic Directorship of Richard Gill. The theatre venue (formerly the Holy Trinity Halls in Wimbledon) opened on 20 November 1979 and was the UK’s first theatre venue dedicated exclusively to children. The opening was marked with a Gala performance attended by Queen Elizabeth The Queen Mother.

By 1983 Polka was regularly programming and producing productions aimed specifically at children under 5 in its studio space, known as the Adventure Theatre.  The Adventure Theatre hosts in house productions and visiting productions from the UK and overseas. Over recent years Polka has developed its Early Years work for children aged from 6 months.

Polka Theatre won the Vivien Duffield Theatre Award to begin the audience development initiative, Curtain-Up! in 1994. The scheme offers free theatre tickets to disadvantaged schools whose pupils would otherwise not have the opportunity to experience theatre due to financial or other difficulties, supplemented by money to cover transport costs and a free post-show drama workshop to support the visits.

The building temporarily closed for a major redevelopment on Monday 18 February 2019, with building work commencing in March 2019. The planned reopening was Summer 2020 but was delayed due to the effects of the pandemic.  Cinderella: the AWESOME Truth was then scheduled for November 2021 as the Theatre's first production after reopening.

Artistic Directors
The current Artistic Director Peter Glanville  was appointed in August 2013 having previously been the Artistic Director/ Chief Executive of Little Angel Theatre, Islington.

 1967- 1988 Richard Gill
 1988- 2002 Vicky Ireland
 2002- 2007 Annie Wood
 2007– 2013 Jonathan Lloyd
 2013–present Peter Glanville

Awards
2014 Eleanor Farjeon Award winner
2015 Best Production for Young People (under 8 years) for Peter Pan, Winner

Gallery

References

External links

 Official website

Theatres in the London Borough of Merton
Children's theatre
Buildings and structures in Wimbledon, London